Caroline Pickering Puamau (born 1 May 1980) is a 2-time Olympic and national record-holding swimmer from Fiji. She swam at the 1996 and 2000 Olympics; as well as at the 2002 Commonwealth Games in Manchester.

She also competed in the 2003 South Pacific Games in Suva, winning two gold medals, three silver and one bronze, and in the 2007 South Pacific Games in Apia, where she won two gold medals, three silver and two bronze. She lit the cauldron during the opening ceremony at the 2003 Games.

Puamau declined to take part in the qualifiers for the 2008 Summer Olympics in Beijing, stating: "Right now I'm into coaching."

References

External links

1980 births
Fijian female freestyle swimmers
Fijian female swimmers
Olympic swimmers of Fiji
Swimmers at the 1996 Summer Olympics
Swimmers at the 2000 Summer Olympics
Swimmers at the 2002 Commonwealth Games
Commonwealth Games competitors for Fiji
Living people
Fijian people of British descent
20th-century Fijian women
21st-century Fijian women